Hedong District is located at the heart of the municipality of Tianjin, People's Republic of China. Its name literally means "east of the river", referring to its location east of the Hai River. Parts of the district were once part of the Russian Concession during the colonial period in the early 20th century. 

As of 2020, Hedong District has a population of 858,787. It hosts Tianjin Railway Station, Tianjin Customs House and General Mail Office of Tianjin. It also hosts Tianjin Conservatory of Music and Tianjin Polytechnic University (which used to be a branch of Tianjin University, the oldest university of China).

History 
In 1125, the territory of what would become Hedong District was part of Dazhigu, and fell under the control of Jin dynasty. It became a maritime transport hub during the Yuan dynasty. In 1404, the Ming dynasty built a series of military settlement on the southern bank of Hai River, causing the economic center of the region to shift south away from Dazhigu. For the rest of the Ming dynasty, Dazhigu remained part of Jinghai county.

During the Qing dynasty, the area belonged to Wuqing county. After Eight-Nation Alliance occupied Tianjin in 1900, a portion of Wuqing county became part of Russian concession, while a piece of land south of Russian concession was given to Belgian as concession. In 1924, Republic of China regain the control of Russian concession, and set it as the 3rd district. Belgian concession was returned in 1931, where it became the 4th district. The city of Tianjin was occupied by Japan from 1937 to 1945, during which the border of districts within the city was redrawn 4 times. 

After the founding of People's Republic of China, the area was divided into the 4th and 5th districts in 1951, and the latter was merged into the 4th district a year later. In 1956, the 4th district was given the current name Hedong. Its name was shortly changed to Dongfeng() district in 1966, before changing back two years later.

Administrative divisions
There are 13 subdistricts in the district:

Transportation

Metro
Hedong is currently served by three metro lines operated by Tianjin Metro:

  - Tianjinzhan , Yuanyangguojizhongxin, Shunchiqiao, Jingjianglu, Cuifuxincun
  - Tianjinzhan 
  - Tianjinzhan , Dawangzhuang, Shiyijing Road, Zhigu, Dongxing Road, Zhongshanmen, Yihaoqiao, Erhaoqiao

Education

Universities 
Tianjin Conservatory of Music
Tianjin Polytechnic

High schools 
Number Seven High School
 High School Attached to Conservatory of Music
  No. 32 High School

Primary schools 
 Hedong Experimental Primary School
 Hedong First Center Primary School

Culture and leisure

Cultural Interests 

 Tianjin Railway Station
 Tianjin Custom House
 General Mail Office of Tianjin
 Hedong Library
 Music Street

Parks 
  Second Palace Park
  Hedong Park
  Riverside (Hebin) Park

Hospitals 
 Tianjin First Center Hospital (Dong Yuan)
 Tianjin Third Center Hospital
 Tianjin Fragrant Hill Hospital

References

Districts of Tianjin